Primark Stores Limited (trading as Penneys in the Republic of Ireland) is an Irish multinational fast fashion retailer with headquarters in Dublin, Ireland.  It has stores across Europe and in the United States. The original Penneys brand is not used outside of Ireland because it is owned elsewhere by American retailer J. C. Penney.

History
The company's first store, named Penneys and still in operation today, was established by Arthur Ryan in June 1969 on behalf of the Weston family (who had founded Associated British Foods in 1935) at 47 Mary Street in Dublin. The first major stores outside of Dublin were opened in the cities of Cork and Belfast in 1971.

The company subsequently expanded outside of Ireland and into Great Britain, opening a store in Derby in 1973. The company could not use the name "Penneys" in Europe outside Ireland, as it was registered by J. C. Penney. The name "Primark" was then invented to use outside Ireland. The company continues to use the Penneys brand in Ireland.

In 2005, Primark bought UK retailer Littlewoods's retail stores for £409 million, retaining 40 of the 119 stores and selling the rest.

In May 2006, the first Primark store in mainland Europe opened in Madrid, Spain. In December 2008, Primark opened in the Netherlands, followed by Portugal, Germany and Belgium in 2009, Austria in 2012, France in 2013, and Italy in 2014.

Primark opened its current headquarters in 2015 in a redeveloped Dublin building, Arthur Ryan House, formerly Chapel House.

In 2015, Primark opened its first United States store in Boston, later expanding into New York City, Philadelphia, Danbury and Chicago. Having built a chain of around 40 stores in Spain, Primark opened a second store in Madrid in October 2015, its second-biggest in the world. On 13 June 2019, Primark expanded to Slovenia with a store in Ljubljana.

On 23 March 2020, Primark temporarily closed their 189 UK stores, as a result of government restrictions during the COVID-19 outbreak. Its 153 stores in England re-opened on 15 June 2020. As a result of the lockdown, the company reported a sales loss of £430 million.

On 10 August 2020, Primark opened the first store in Poland in Galeria Młociny, Warsaw, later expanding into Poznań.

In 2021, Primark unveiled a sustainability strategy that sets targets to reduce textile waste, halving CO2 emissions and improving the life of Primark workers.

On 15 December 2022, Primark opened its first store in Romania, in Bucharest.

In November 2022, Primark announced it was going online with a new click-and-collect service. This announcement came after the company lost more than £1 billion in sales during the Covid-19 pandemic, when its stores had to be closed, while the competitors with online stores had smaller or no financial losses. The click-and-collect service was launched as a trial in 25 stores in north-west England, Yorkshire and north Wales for children's products only. However, on the day of launch of the new service, the company's website crashed, causing the issues for people trying to access it.

Products
Primark offers a diverse range of products, including: baby and children's clothing, womenswear, menswear, homeware, accessories, footwear, beauty products and confectionery. The chain sells clothes at prices below those typically charged.

From 2014, Primark began selling makeup products. Primark started selling vegan snacks from January 2018. Laura O' Sullivan, co-founder of Primark, expressed her support of the new snacks.

Along with retailers such as Zara and H&M, Primark contributes to the contemporary fast fashion trend. According to an article about Primark in The Economist, "For many shoppers, Primark has an irresistible offer: trendy clothes at astonishingly low prices. The result is a new and even faster kind of fast fashion, which encourages consumers to buy heaps of items, discard them after a few wears and then come back for another batch of new outfits."

In 2020, Primark launched their Wellness collection which includes 80 eco-conscious products. All of the products are made of organic, sustainable or recycled materials. This is part of the retailer's commitment to be more responsible for its footprint.

Working practices
In 2006, Primark joined the Ethical Trading Initiative (ETI), a collaborative organisation bringing together businesses, trades unions and NGOs to work on labour rights issues in their supply chains. ETI members commit to working towards the implementation of a code of conduct based on the International Labour Organization's core conventions.

In December 2008, the UK charity War on Want launched a new report, Fashion Victims II, that showed conditions had not improved in Bangladeshi factories supplying Primark, two years after the charity first visited them.

On 9 January 2009, a supplier was forced by ETI to remove its branding from Primark stores and websites following a BBC/The Observer investigation into the employment practices. The investigation alleged the use of illegal immigrant labour and argued that the workers were paid less than the UK legal minimum wage.

On 16 June 2011, the BBC Trust's Editorial Standards Committee (ESC) published its findings into a Panorama programme "Primark: On the Rack", broadcast in June 2008. The programme was an undercover investigative documentary examining poor working conditions in Indian factories supplying Primark. Although Primark subsequently stopped doing business with the Indian supplier, the ESC concluded that footage in the programme was 'more likely than not' to have been fabricated. The ESC directed the BBC to make an on-air apology and to ensure that the programme was not repeated or sold to other broadcasters.  Primark created a specific website to deal with the issues around the programme.

In 2011 and 2012, Primark achieved 'Leader' status in the Ethical Trading Initiative.

In June 2013, two labels both stitched with alleged SOS messages were separately found in garments purchased from a store in Swansea, Wales. Primark argued the supply chain showed these label messages were a hoax.

Also in June 2014, a customer from Ireland allegedly found an SOS note wrapped in a prison ID card in the pocket of trousers purchased from a Primark store several years earlier. The letter was written in Chinese and said to report that prisoners were forced to work "like oxen" making fashion clothes for export for 15 hours per day and that the food they were given would not be fit for animals.

A year and a half later an alleged SOS note from a Chinese torture victim was found in socks purchased from Primark.

In December 2018, a bone was found by a customer in a sock purchased in the shop's Colchester branch.

Gallery

References

External links

Associated British Foods
Clothing retailers of Ireland
Clothing companies established in 1969
Retail companies established in 1969
Irish brands
1969 establishments in Ireland